IHB may refer to:

 Indiana Harbor Belt Railroad
 Indiana Historical Bureau
 Irregular heartbeat
 International Hydrographic Bureau or as it's more currently known the International Hydrographic Organization